Lieutenant General Sir James Alexander Lindsay,  (25 August 1815 – 13 August 1874) was a British Army officer, Conservative Party politician, and member of Clan Lindsay.

Career
Born at Muncaster Castle in 1815, James was the second son of James Lindsay, 24th Earl of Crawford. Educated at Eton, Lindsay was commissioned an ensign in the Grenadier Guards on 16 March 1832.

He was returned as Member of Parliament (MP) for Wigan at a by-election in October 1845, and held the seat until he was defeated at the 1857 general election. He regained the seat at the 1859 election. Promoted lieutenant colonel in 1860, he was commanding the Brigade of Guards in London in 1861. He then served as a major general on the staff in Canada from 1863 to 1867. During this period, in March 1866, he resigned from Parliament by becoming Steward of the Manor of Northstead.

Lindsay served as Major General commanding the Brigade of Guards from 1867 to 1868, and inspector general of reserve forces from 1868 to 1870. He was seconded from this command to serve as Commander of the British Troops in Canada during the Red River Rebellion, and organised the force of the Wolseley Expedition. On 15 September 1870, he was appointed to the colonelcy of The Buffs. He was promoted to lieutenant general on 10 October 1870. For his services in Canada, Lindsay was made a Knight Commander of the Order of St Michael and St George on 22 December 1870. Lindsay died at Cranmer House, Mitcham in 1874.

Family
Lindsay married Lady Sarah Elizabeth Savile, the daughter of John Savile, 3rd Earl of Mexborough, on 6 November 1845. They had children:
James Greville Lindsay, died young
Reginald Dalrymple Lindsay, died young
Maud Isabella Lindsay
Mabel Lindsay (d. 1928), married Lieutenant Colonel William John Frescheville Ramsden
Mary Egidia Lindsay (d. 1911), married John Coutts Antrobus, son of Gibbs Antrobus

References

External links
 

 

|-

|-

1815 births
1874 deaths
British Army lieutenant generals
Buffs (Royal East Kent Regiment) officers
Grenadier Guards officers
Knights Commander of the Order of St Michael and St George
Conservative Party (UK) MPs for English constituencies
People educated at Eton College
UK MPs 1841–1847
UK MPs 1847–1852
UK MPs 1852–1857
UK MPs 1859–1865
UK MPs 1865–1868
Younger sons of earls
James
Members of the Parliament of the United Kingdom for Wigan
People of the Red River Rebellion
Military personnel from Cumberland